Cranium Command was an attraction at the Wonders of Life pavilion at Walt Disney World Resort's Epcot theme park. The show was a humorous presentation on the importance of the human brain.

The show's script was written by Jenny Tripp, a staff writer in Disney Feature Animation, and directed by Jerry Rees, who in addition to many other Disney film-based attractions, directed The Brave Little Toaster. The pre-show itself was the first directing effort of Gary Trousdale and Kirk Wise, famous for later directing Beauty and the Beast and The Hunchback of Notre Dame.

It premiered on October 19, 1989; as of January 4, 2004 it began to operate seasonally, closing permanently on January 1, 2007. During the 2007 International Food & Wine Festival, the entrance was used as a wine presentation. The pavilion has continued to be used for various Epcot festival events.

Preshow
From the entrance at the back of the pavilion, guests walked into a very basic, sparsely themed holding room with a digital counter reading the time until the next show. On the walls hung propaganda posters encouraging guests to enlist in the "Cranium Command" (similar signage could be seen advertising the show around the Wonders of Life pavilion). Also there was signage including brain teasers and humorous gags and puns, setting the stage for both the concept and tone. Guests were then led into a narrow, tall room with brightly colored carpeted walls. Facing the guests was a plain movie screen, and closed automatic doors to their left.

The movie screen would soon illuminate showing an animated segment featuring the boisterous and loud General Knowledge (voiced by Corey Burton) briefing his "Cranium Commando" troops on their mission: to pilot human brains and keep the people they're in out of trouble. A bumbling little soldier named Buzzy (Scott Curtis) had been given one of the most difficult missions of all: piloting a twelve-year-old boy.

When General Knowledge spoke in the pre-show and was explaining that they were different kinds of brains, he showed a picture of Albert Einstein, as the example of a person who used his brain and Ernest P. Worrell (a popular fictional character played by Jim Varney, who was appearing in series of feature films produced by Disney at the time), as an example of the opposite. At the end of the preshow, General Knowledge asked the guests, "Hey, you Goldbricks! This ain't no Spectator Sport! Where do you think you are, Disney World?! Get your strollers in line and hustle!", pointing towards the theater as the automatic doors swung open.

Show
The main show was presented in a 200-seat, dimly-lit theater designed to represent the inside of a human head; the outside world seen on rear projection screens where the eyes would be. Buzzy was now presented as an Audio-Animatronic on an articulated seat so that he could move around during the performance. Helping him pilot the twelve-year-old named Bobby (also acted by Scott Curtis), via appearances on other screens, were the logical Left Brain (Charles Grodin), the wacky Right Brain (Jon Lovitz), the hungry Stomach (George Wendt), the panicky Bladder who is also referred to as "Elimination" (Jeff Doucette, in an uncredited role), the Adrenal Gland (Bobcat Goldthwait) who was prone to overreacting, and the heart's Right and Left Ventricles (Dana Carvey and Kevin Nealon, reprising their Hans and Franz roles from Saturday Night Live). The monotone Hypothalamus (voiced by Kirk Wise), which regulated autonomic bodily functions, was represented via Audio-Animatronics as a robot.

The show took Buzzy's host through a typical day: getting up, skipping breakfast, running to school after missing the bus, becoming infatuated with new girl in Science class named Annie (Natalie Gregory), protecting her from bullies, getting involved in a food fight at lunch, getting sent to the principal (Kenneth Kimmins), and being thanked by Annie, then kissed after asking her out. At each point in the day, the various organs of the body talked to Buzzy, explained the problems they were facing, and in many cases argued over how Buzzy should deal with the situation. In the end, Buzzy (via help of General Knowledge's advice) eventually learned how to effectively balance the needs of his body crew in order to combat potential stressful situations.

Origins
The attraction was the only fully surviving element from the original 1978 plans for EPCOT Center's "Life and Health" pavilion. Titled "The Head Trip", it was to share a theatre space with a dentistry-themed show called "Tooth Follies". Designed by legendary Imagineer Rolly Crump, the stage and concept would be similar to the final incarnation, but with three animatronics dedicated to emotion, intellect and the nervous system. When Disney was unable to find a sponsor to host the pavilion, the construction of Life and Health was delayed indefinitely. However, an expansion pad between the Universe of Energy pavilion and the Horizons pavilion was kept as Disney still planned to build it.

In the mid-1980s, then Disney CEO Michael Eisner finally secured MetLife to sponsor the Life and Health pavilion, now renamed "Wonders of Life" and restarted development. Imagineer Steve Kirk replaced Crump on the project, and worked with Barry Braveman to flesh out the idea of "The Head Trip" into its own full attraction. Partially inspired by the 1943 Walt Disney-produced animated propaganda film Reason and Emotion, they explored the idea of transforming the concept into a parody of the Star Trek franchise. The human head was to be represented as a bridge on a spaceship much like the Starship Enterprise. Kirk explains: "...there was one character with a supporting cast on film for different parts of the body. Originally there was a captain, a Mr. Spock type, several ensigns at each of the senses, there was an officer for reason, there was an officer for emotion... so there was a little cast of these little characters about, maybe, 2 feet tall in this pretty big theatre that was a pretty involved bridge of a ship, which was, again, inside the human head." Eventually, the budget was reduced to only be able to include one audio-animatronic figure and a robot, eventually becoming the Hypothalamus. Kirk hoped that the show would have been reprogrammed over the years to include different versions of the show in order to discuss a variety of health-related topics, but that idea never came to be.

Production
With the budget reduction also came a new take on the concept along with its final name. Now titled "Cranium Command", the show featured a military theme wherein "brain pilots" take control of a mechanized human head. The main audio-animatronic character was dubbed "Captain Cortex" and ran the body, now that of a young boy, much like one would a military craft. He reports under his commanding officer "General Knowledge", who lectured the audience during the pre-show and then to Cortex in the main show. With time and resources running low, Imagineering outsourced production of the animated and live-action film portions to Colossal Pictures. However, halfway into production Disney executives killed this version of the project to have it retooled by their own Feature Animation department. Animator Steve Moore, who worked on both versions, recalled, "They were doing more of a Fred Crippen, Roger Ramjet style, which was fun, but not winning points with the clients. Storytelling was Colossal's Achilles heel ...they took the story given to them by Imagineering and followed it, thinking they were giving their client what they wanted.  Unfortunately, it was written like an educational film from the '40s - very dry and condescending.  No amount of style could make up for the lack of substance.  And even though Colossal was executing Imagineering's story,  their inability to interpret the story into something workable sunk them."

In May 1989, director Jerry Rees was approached by Peter Schneider, (at the time) president of Walt Disney Feature Animation, to speak with several Disney brass members including Eisner, Jeffrey Katzenberg, Marty Sklar and Tom Fitzgerald. They all unanimously loathed Colossal Pictures' take on "Cranium Command" and sought him out to fix it. After a brief review, Rees cited the various issues and recommended that the project be rewritten from scratch. The executives gave Rees full creative freedom aside from needing to keep General Knowledge and the overall stress-management theme, per the sponsor's request. Unfortunately they only had five months to complete the project, as they had to reach the October deadline.

Animation
Rees rounded up as many animators from Feature Animation as he could, including Gary Trousdale, Kirk Wise and Tom Sito. The latter three along with Rees crafted an entirely new storyline in under a week with Jenny Tripp penning the script. One of the largest changes was the personality of General Knowledge, now based on R. Lee Ermey's character from Full Metal Jacket. Per Wise, "We thought it would be funny if the character who was supposed to teach you how to manage your stress screamed at you incessantly like a psychotic drill sergeant." They also changed the pilot's name from Captain Cortex to Buzzy, a bumbling young recruit. Rob Minkoff was slated to direct the animated preshow as Rees needed to focus on the live-action heavy main show, but dropped out to take over the Roger Rabbit short "Roller Coaster Rabbit". Schneider desperately asked the unproven Trousdale and Wise duo to step in as directors. Wise claims, "Saying "yes" turned out to be the smartest thing Gary and I ever did." In addition, the pre-show of "Cranium Command" was the very last project at Disney Feature Animation to be traditionally inked and painted on cels.

Filming
While work on the animation commenced at the newly built animation wing at Disney-MGM Studios, Rees flew to Los Angeles to begin filming the live-action main show elements. Eventually he would end up directing nearly all of the show elements, per him: “Everything that you see and hear from the 8 screens, 2 Audio-Animatronic figures, and the 10 discreet channels of sound." The complexity of creating the seemingly uncut point-of-view shots which had to interact with several other pieces of media was a "wild" task for the ambitious director. Without optical or digital assistance, he used camera tricks and matching blur frames to stitch together the POV footage to seem like one continuous shot. In addition, Rees took the cinematographer and camera operators to the filming locations prior to shooting. When there, they would do tests to figure out how to make the camera express behavior and emotion such as shyness, love, anger, fear, panic and worry. This was essential to the intended immersion that you were inside a boy's head, looking out his eyes as he experienced life and reacted to it.

After the POV filming was complete, Rees took to a soundstage to film the live-action scenes involving the "body crew". Wanting to turn audience members' expectations on their ears, he cast various famous comedians of the time to play the roles in zany sets. The project's complexities continued to dominate, as Rees had to put one eye on the filming and one eye on a monitor playing the POV video in order to cue up the footage accordingly. Finally, he reached post-production by first mocking the eight screens of the theatre in Los Angeles and editing all the various film items together along with the animatronic dialogue, which bewildered executives such as Katzenberg when reviewing the production.

Programming the Animatronics
Once editing was complete, Rees came back to Orlando and spent the remaining time with Imagineering in the finished theatre putting all the pieces together. While Rees himself articulated the audio-animatronic of Buzzy, animator Rebecca Rees (Jerry's wife) took control of the live-animation of the droning Hypothalamus robot, as she was the one who came up with the idea behind the character. In an uncredited role, Kirk Wise voiced the Hypothalamus. For the animation of the Buzzy animatronic, Rees used the concept of the articulated arm the character sits on to create the illusion of centrifugal force. For example, when the boy's head turned right (simulated through the POV eye footage), Buzzy's platform and chair would swing to the left. This was yet another device to immerse the audience into the experience to feel like they were riding inside a human head even though the bench seating in the theatre did not move.

Music
Composer David Newman, who had previously worked with Rees on "The Brave Little Toaster" and "Back to Neverland" (a short about animation at Disney-MGM Studios starring Walter Cronkite and Robin Williams) wrote the show's music score. The pre-show's score evokes the tone of military marching music, but becomes more orchestral in the main show. Unlike most music created for theme park attractions, there are multiple leitmotifs more in common with a fuller film score. In an interview, Newman briefly cited that it was a lot of fun, much like his other projects with Rees.

Reception and legacy
Cranium Commands opening was largely overshadowed by its sister attraction in Wonders of Life, the flight simulator thrill ride Body Wars. (Epcot's first) It also happened to have a poor location, tucked away in the back obscured by many other exhibits. Still, the attraction was regarded then and for almost the entire pavilion's lifespan as its "hidden gem" for its wit, charm, self-aware humor and fast-paced nature. The "Unofficial Guide to Walt Disney World" book series even termed the attraction as "Epcot's hidden gem," stating "Epcot and Walt Disney World could use a lot more of this type of humor." It remains beloved by many Disney fans a decade after its closure. Jerry Rees even stated that out of the record-setting 13 theme park attractions he helmed for Disney, Cranium Command was at the top of the list of the ones he most loved working on, so much so that for years afterward he unsuccessfully tried to get a feature film made shot entirely from a man's point-of-view.

A "Cranium Command" trading pin featuring Buzzy was released in 2012 in tribute of Epcot's 30th anniversary and a Vinylmation twin pack featuring Buzzy and General Knowledge was released in 2014.

The attraction never changed over the course of its 17-year lifespan, aside from the entrance marquee. Upon opening, the entrance advertised the famous live-action comedians featured in the show but did not stick out much. In the mid-90s, it was remodeled to a much more theatrical appearance, focusing more on the militaristic and animated portions of the show, proudly featuring General Knowledge and Buzzy.

Ties to other Disney projects
The show has a number of ties to important Disney history as well. At the grand opening, Jeffrey Katzenberg was so impressed by the pre-show that he claimed it was almost more entertaining than the main show itself. When he got back to Glendale, he found himself needing to assign a new director to Beauty and the Beast after firing Richard Purdum from the project due to creative differences. Immediately he thought of Gary Trousdale and Kirk Wise, who were major players on turning the troubled Cranium Command project around in record time, and giving it a great sense of humor which Beauty and the Beast desperately needed at the moment. Katzenberg quickly hired the duo who in turn ended up making Beauty and the Beast one of the most critically acclaimed animated films of all-time, and one of Disney's largest hits.

One of Pete Docter's first jobs was as an animator on the project. He would later become a director at Pixar. Docter's third feature Inside Out had a very similar premise (exploring the mind of an 11-year-old girl) and he has credited the attraction as an inspiration for that film.

The Disney short Inner Workings, which debuted with Walt Disney Animation Studios' Moana also shares similar themes. Directed by Leo Matsuda, the short "is the story of the internal struggle between a man’s Brain—a pragmatic protector who calculates his every move, and his Heart—a free-spirited adventurer who wants to let loose." Cranium Command, along with the World War II propaganda short Reason and Emotion is cited as one of the main inspirations for the short.

Status after ride closure
After shutting down in 2007, the attraction was left intact but closed to public access. In 2017, Matt Sonswa, an urban explorer, posted an exploration video on YouTube of the show building showing the pre-show, theater, and animatronics to be in good condition. A number of animatronic elements including Buzzy were marked by the Walt Disney archives for preservation. Cranium Command subsequently became an increasingly popular destination for urban explorers.

On February 21, 2019, Disney announced that the Wonders of Life pavilion, including the Cranium Command show building, will be repurposed as a new pavilion entitled Play! Pavilion. What will happen to the show itself is currently unknown.

Reported theft
In December 2018 it was reported that the Buzzy animatronic had been stolen. The theft generated a considerable amount of reactions and speculation.

In January 2019, Disney urban explorer Dave Ensign claimed on the Cinemoddities podcast that he had contacted Disney insiders and discovered that Buzzy had never been stolen although his hat and coat were. Allegedly, urban explorers were frequently taking selfies with Buzzy who was mounted dangerously high above a mechanical pit in the stage. Ensign explained that facility operations had "stolen" the figure: "They had an order to remove him so people wouldn't hurt themselves by sneaking in there and climbing on the sets. Unfortunately, nobody told operations or security who found it missing and assumed he'd been stolen." Disney made no official comment on the matter.

In May 2019, the Orlando Sentinel reported that the Buzzy animatronic was still missing from the closed attraction. Later that month, former Disney employee Patrick Spikes was arrested in connection to the theft of the Buzzy animatronic character's belongings and selling them on the black market. His cousin Blaytin Taunton was also charged for his role in the theft. In February 2020, after both men made a plea deal of no contest regarding the theft and sale of the belongings and those of Haunted Mansion props, Spikes was sentenced to ten years probation and 250 hours of community service, while Taunton was sentenced to five years probation and 125 hours of community service. Both men were also ordered to pay over $25,000 in restitution and are no longer permitted to set foot on Disney property.

Attraction facts
 Grand opening: October 19, 1989
 Pre-show length: 5:00
 Show length: 17:00
 New show every: 18:00
 Ride system:''' Audio-Animatronic theater presentation

See also
 Epcot
 Wonders of Life
 List of Epcot attractions
 Inside Out'' (2015), a Disney-Pixar film characterizing the emotions inside a girl.

References

External links

Walt Disney World Resort - Cranium Command

Amusement rides introduced in 1989
Amusement rides that closed in 2007
Former Walt Disney Parks and Resorts attractions
Walt Disney Parks and Resorts films
Audio-Animatronic attractions
Future World (Epcot)
1989 establishments in Florida
2007 disestablishments in Florida